Analogue Bubblebath Vol 3 is an EP by electronic musician Richard D. James, under the pseudonym of AFX, released in 1992 on Rephlex Records. It is the third release in the Analogue Bubblebath series, and his first release to use the AFX variation of his pseudonym Aphex Twin. 

The original EP consists of nine songs distributed across eight tracks. It was originally released on 12" vinyl, then some months later (in early 1993) on compact disc, with several additional tracks. It entered the dance singles chart at number 40 on 13 February 1993.

Releases

Original
The original vinyl release came in a brown paper bag, enclosed with liner notes describing Rephlex Records and various places of interest in Cornwall, England. The liner notes also contain instructions for playing the final track of side one (".0180871"), which is two songs running simultaneously, each panned to the left and right channels. All songs except for ".38" appeared on future re-releases. The original vinyl release is the only format of Analogue Bubblebath Vol 3 that is presented with a track listing.

The original CD release was sparse in its packaging; it came in a clear slimline jewel case, wrapped in bubble wrap. The case contained no liner notes whatsoever, save for a sticker affixed to the front, referring to the third release in the Analogue Bubblebath series and the mailing address for Rephlex Records. The sticker is subtitled with "66% more bubbles" and decorated with images of soap bubbles. The disc has no print or label on it. There is no indication of a track listing anywhere on the package; eight out of thirteen of the songs are identical to (or are edited versions of) those that appear on the vinyl format, but five of the songs (tracks 8, 9, 11, 12 and 13) have never been released with an official title. Of these five untitled songs, tracks 8, 9 and 13 would later appear in vinyl form on Analogue Bubblebath 3.1 and the vinyl reissue of Analogue Bubblebath vol. 3, and track 11 would also appear on the vinyl reissue.  The twelfth track is exclusive to the CD release. The playing order of the songs are also altered from the vinyl. The two songs entitled ".0180871" are the same as those that appear combined on the vinyl version, but are split into their own separate tracks.

Reissues
The CD version was reissued in 1997 with minor differences in appearance and presentation. The "66% more bubbles" subtitle is replaced with composing and producing credits to Richard D. James, and the accompanying images of bubbles are replaced with Aphex Twin logos. The reissue has an additional sticker affixed to the back detailing legal information and other AFX releases available, such as Analogue Bubblebath 4.  The CD version has since been released as a digital download.

The vinyl version saw a reissue in 2002, which was released as a double EP with updated artwork. The cover features pictograms of a woman and a man. The playing order of the songs differ to those of both the original vinyl version and CD version.

Track listing
All songs written and composed by Richard D. James.

Original vinyl version

Side one
 ".215061" – 4:16
 ".000890569" – 4:31
 ".38" – 0:38
 ".0180871"
 Left channel – 3:45
Right channel – 4:10

Side two
 ".55278037732581" – 4:18
 ".942937" – 4:31
 ".1993841" – 5:43
 "AFX 6/b" – 0:31

Compact Disc version
 ".215061" – 3:54()
 ".1993841" – 8:02
 ".0180871a" – 4:16
 ".942937" – 4:37
 ".0180871b" – 3:52
 ".000890569" – 4:48
 ".55278037732581"  – 4:20
 "(CAT 00897-AA1) [Fluted]" – 4:05
 "(CAT 00897-A1)" – 5:06
 "Afx 6/b" – 0:36
 (untitled) – 4:41
 (untitled) – 0:53
 "(CAT 00897-A2)" – 5:14

2002 vinyl reissue

Side one
 ".215061" – 3:50
 ".000890569" – 4:48
 ".0180871R" – 4:11

Side two
 ".942937" – 4:31
 ".55278037732581"  – 4:19
 ".0180871L" – 3:52

Side three
 ".1993841" – 8:03
 "(CAT 00897-B1)" – 4:06

Side four
 "(CAT 00897-A1)" – 5:07
 "(CAT 00897-A2)" – 5:15
 "(CD Only Track #1)"-4:42

References

External links
 More info, artwork and samples here
 Complete AFX discography

Acid techno albums
1992 EPs
Aphex Twin EPs
Rephlex Records EPs